Hypervitaminosis is a condition of abnormally high storage levels of vitamins, which can lead to various symptoms as over excitement, irritability, or even toxicity. Specific medical names of the different conditions are derived from the given vitamin involved: an excess of vitamin A, for example, is called hypervitaminosis A. Hypervitaminoses are primarily caused by fat-soluble vitamins  (D and A), as these are stored by the body for longer than the water-soluble vitamins.

Generally, toxic levels of vitamins stem from high supplement intake and not always from natural sources but rather the mix of natural, derived vitamins and enhancers (vitamin boosters). Toxicities of fat-soluble vitamins can also be caused by a large intake of highly fortified foods, but natural food in modest levels rarely deliver extreme or dangerous levels of fat-soluble vitamins. The Dietary Reference Intake recommendations from the United States Department of Agriculture define a "tolerable upper intake level" for most vitamins.

For those who are entirely healthy and do not experience long periods of avitaminosis, vitamin overdose can be avoided by not taking more than the normal or recommended amount of multi-vitamin supplement shown on the bottle and not ingesting multiple vitamin-containing supplements concurrently.

Signs and symptoms

A few described symptoms:

 Frequent urination and/or cloudy urine
 Increased urine amount
 Eye irritation and/or increased sensitivity to light
 Irregular and/or rapid heartbeat
 Bone and joint pain (associated with avitaminosis)
 Muscle pain
 Confusion and mood changes ( e.g. irritability, inability to focus)
 Convulsions
 Fatigue
 Headache
 Flushing of skin (associated with niacin (vitamin B3) overdose)
 Skin disturbances (e.g. dryness, itching, cracking of skin, rashes, increased sensitivity to sun)
 Changes of hair texture (e.g. thickening and/or clumping of hair)
 Appetite loss
 Constipation (associated with iron or calcium overdose)
 Nausea and vomiting
 Diarrhoea
 Moderate weight loss (more commonly seen in long-term overdose cases)

Causes
With few exceptions, like some vitamins from B-complex, hypervitaminosis usually occurs with the fat-soluble vitamins A and D, which are stored, respectively, in the liver and fatty tissues of the body. These vitamins build up and remain for a longer time in the body than water-soluble vitamins. Conditions include:
 Hypervitaminosis A
 Hypervitaminosis D
 Vitamin B3 § Toxicity
 Megavitamin-B6 syndrome

Prevention

Prevention in healthy individuals not having any periods of avitaminosis or vitamin (vegetables) lack for 2 years at least is by not taking more than the expected normal or recommended amount of vitamin supplements.

Epidemiology 
In the United States, overdose exposure to all formulations of "vitamins" (which includes multi-vitamin/mineral products) was reported by 62,562 individuals in 2004 with nearly 80% of these exposures in children under the age of 6, leading to 53 "major" life-threatening outcomes and 3 deaths (2 from vitamins D and E; 1 from a multivitamin with iron). This may be compared to the 19,250 people who died of unintentional poisoning of all kinds in the U.S. in the same year (2004). In 2016, overdose exposure to all formulations of vitamins and multi-vitamin/mineral formulations was reported by 63,931 individuals to the American Association of Poison Control Centers with 72% of these exposures in children under the age of five. No deaths were reported.

See also
 Avitaminosis
 Megavitamin therapy
 Vitamin C megadosage

References

External links 

 Dietary reference intakes, official website.

 
Effects of external causes